Ivana Kovačević (born December 27, 1994) is a cross country skier from Serbia. She competed for Serbia at the 2014 Winter Olympics in the cross country skiing events.

References

1994 births
Living people
Olympic cross-country skiers of Serbia
Cross-country skiers at the 2014 Winter Olympics
Serbian female cross-country skiers